Fowl Play can refer to:

 Fowl Play (1937 film), a Popeye animated film
 "Fowl Play", an episode of Back at the Barnyard (a television show) aired in November 2007
 Fowl Play, a documentary about the egg industry produced by Mercy for Animals (2009)
 Fowl Play (album), by Sister Sparrow & the Dirty Birds
 "Fowl Play", an improv comedy group at Rochester Institute of Technology

See also
 Foul Play (disambiguation)